Ever After is the third studio album by Canadian rock group Marianas Trench. It was released on November 21, 2011, in Canada and December 21, 2011, in the US. The album was certified Double Platinum by Music Canada in January 2018. Five singles were released from the album, including the Canadian Hot 100 Top 10 hit "Haven't Had Enough" and the Top 20 Canada Hot AC airplay hits "Stutter" and "By Now". The album's first four singles have been certified Double Platinum by Music Canada.

Background

Composition 
After months of anticipation, Ramsay announced on Twitter that the album will be titled Ever After. The band announced that the album would be released on November 29, 2011, however this date was later pushed up to November 21. The band announced that there would not be any breaks in between the tracks on the record, and would instead have a new track start as soon as the previous track ended, without a pause, making it an hour-long continuous piece of music. Production on the album began in Spring 2011.

Storyline
Ever After is a concept album, (as was Masterpiece Theatre). In addition to the fact that there is no pause between the tracks, Ever After also has a storyline told through the album's songs as well as its booklet. The story tells of a fictionalized Josh Ramsay and his adventures in the fantasy kingdom of Toyland.

Josh Ramsay meets the ex-King of Toyland upon his waking up in a strange land in front of a toy factory. The King tells Josh that he was overthrown by his wife Queen Carolina, after seducing him into a feeling of safety. She then stole the heart of his daughter, Princess Porcelain (played by Canadian actress Olivia Ryan-Stern), which caused the king so much pain that he let Carolina take the throne. Carolina locks Porcelain's heart in a box atop a tower, which also holds various things she has also stolen; including Josh's way home. Carolina proceeded to steal the inhabitants' hearts, and build her army of heartless toy soldiers. After hearing this tale, Josh sets off in search of Porcelain and his way home.

Carolina then comes to Josh in the night, and attempts to bribe him into ruling Toyland with her. This meant Josh would never be able to go home, so he turns her down. When Josh comes to, he finds Porcelain, who is human as well. She has the key to the box around her neck. When asked why she isn't a toy like everyone else, she cannot remember. She couldn't remember anything that happened before her heart had been stolen. She explains that Carolina's soldiers have been stealing and locking away hearts without rebellion for some time. Josh and Porcelain then proceed to find the stuttering wise man, the one with the other half of the key.

Once they find the Stuttering Wise Man they discover that he is the brother of the Outcast King, and one of the few remaining inhabitants to have a heart. He explains that Porcelain showed up at the castle as a lost child and was adopted by the king. She is also from Josh's homeland.

The Stuttering Wise Man then leads the two into the factory that creates the heartless toy soldiers. The trio then plead with the heartless soldiers to work together and overthrow the Queen. They soon convince the soldiers to go along with their plan. The Outcast King charges into battle with the rebel soldiers, outnumbered, as Porcelain, the Stuttering Wise Man, and Josh go up to the tower where the box is held.

The Queen sees Josh and tries to brutally attack him. Porcelain and the Prince then open the box as the Queen attempts to steal Josh's heart. After a flash of light, Josh regains consciousness and hears joyful cheers from the courtyard below, and finds that they have defeated the Queen. However, the Stuttering Prince is dead as the other half of the key had been his own heart. Porcelain throws Carolina off the tower to be swarmed by angry toy soldiers. The King retakes the throne and Porcelain and Josh go home, but find that after the adventure, it didn't feel like home, so the two return to the kingdom and live happily ever after.

Singles 
The first single on the album, entitled "Haven't Had Enough" was released in July 2011, and reached the No. 1 spot on iTunes Canada Top of the Charts and Pop Downloads, and the song was named "Song of the Week" by The Tune. The music video for the song was released on August 26, 2011. "By Now" was released as a free download to people who pre-ordered the Deluxe Edition of Ever After on iTunes.
The second official single, "Fallout" was released to iTunes on November 15. The music video was released on February 2, 2012.
The music video for their third single "Desperate Measures" was released on July 4, 2012.
The fourth single was confirmed to be "Stutter" on November 6, 2012. Although not playing the character of Princess Porcelain, actress Olivia Ryan-Stern was heavily featured in this video as well. The music video was released December 20, 2012.
The fifth and final single was "By Now." The music video was released on August 8, 2013.

Promotion 
Through YouTube, the band previewed recordings of a gospel choir for their song Stutter, as well as a few recordings from the band. They toured with The Ready Set, Allstar Weekend, and The Downtown Fiction in the 2011 Glamour Kills Tour. The album cover was revealed on the band's Facebook page on October 17, 2011, and it features a series of toys on a shelf. In October and November, the group supported Simple Plan on their headlining US tour. On February 1, 2012, a music video for "Fallout" premiered via MTV. A behind-the-scenes video was also released. They toured in Canada with Simple Plan, All Time Low, and These Kids Wear Crowns in February. In April, the group planned to go on a tour of the US. However, they had to cancel it due to illness.

In May, the group appeared at The Bamboozle festival in the US. Following this, the group appeared on the Journeys Backyard BBQ Tour, which included indoor and outdoor performances at malls in the US. Further US shows took place following the conclusion of the tour. Some of the shows were performed with The Audition. On July 4, a music video was released for "Desperate Measures". In September, the group performed at the Bazooka Rocks Festival in the Philippines. In May and June, the group went on the Noise Tour with Air Dubai. Preceded by a teaser trailer, a music video was released for "By Now" in June 2013. A deluxe edition of the album was released in March 2014.

Release 
The album became available for full preview on the MuchMusic website a week before the release. The album was released on iTunes the morning of November 20. Hard copies of Ever After became available on November 21. Some stores such as Wal-Mart, are selling limited edition "Fan-packs" of Ever After that include a Marianas Trench T-shirt. As of December 2011, the album was certified gold in Canada for shipments of over 40,000 copies.

Track listing

Personnel
Credits for Ever After adapted from AllMusic.

Marianas Trench
 Josh Ramsay - lead vocals, arranger, bass, composer, drums, engineer, guitar, harmonica, mixing, piano, producer, programming
 Matt Webb - guitar, piano, vocals
 Mike Ayley - bass, rhythm bass, vocals
 Ian Casselman - drums, percussion, vocals

Additional musicians
 Tania Hancheroff - vocals
 Carolynn Hanney - vocals
 Camille Henderson - vocals
 Saffron Henderson - vocals
 Sarah Johns - vocals
 Luren Music - vocals
 Nik Pesut - floor tom
 Miles Ramsay - vocals
 Sara Ramsay - vocals
 John Stamos - lute

Production
 Hal Beckett - conductor
 Zach Blackstone - assistant 
 Josh Bowman – assistant
 Scott Enright - A&R
 Ted Jensen - mastering
 Martin Kierszenbaum - A&R
 Roger Monk - engineer
 Eric Mosher - assistant
 Dave Ogilvie - mixing
 Ivan Otis - photography
 Brad Salter - assistant
 Jonathan Simkin - A&R
 Vancouver Film Orchestra - strings

Tours

Face the Music Tour

Face the Music: With a Vengeance Tour

Charts

Certifications

References

2011 albums
604 Records albums
Marianas Trench (band) albums
Concept albums